The Sentinels of Justice are a number of fictional superhero teams published by AC Comics.

Charlton Comics version

AC Comics version

Founding members

New team
New team launched in Femforce #58-60.

References

AC Comics titles